Toussaint Louverture  is a 2012 French film written and directed by Philippe Niang. It stars Jimmy Jean-Louis, Aïssa Maïga and Sonia Rolland and is based on the life of Toussaint Louverture.

The film premiered at the 2012 Festival de Luchon. It won the Best Diaspora Feature award at the 8th Africa Movie Academy Awards.

Cast
 Jimmy Jean-Louis as Toussaint Louverture
 Aïssa Maïga as Suzanne
 Arthur Jugnot as Pasquier
 Pierre Cassignard as général de division  Étienne Maynaud de Bizefranc de Laveaux
 Éric Viellard as Léger-Félicité Sonthonax
 Magloire Delcros-Varaud as Mars Plaisir
 Féodor Atkine as général de division Marie-François Auguste de Caffarelli du Falga
 Ruddy Sylaire as Georges Biassou
 Giovanni Grangerac as Infant Hyacinthe Moïse
 Yann Ebonge as Hyacinthe Moïse
 Thierry Desroses as Henri Christophe
 Hubert Koundé as Jean-Jacques Dessalines
 Philippe Caroit as Bayon
 Sonia Rolland as Marie-Eugénie Sonthonax
 Stany Coppet as Brigadier general André Rigaud
 Virginie Desarnauts as Catherine Delambre
 Alex Martin as  Mulatto officer
 Mabô Kouyaté as Placide
 Joffrey Platel as général de division Charles Leclerc
 Xavier Lemaître as Marquis d'Hermona
 Thomas Langmann as Napoleon
 Valérie Mairesse as Mother Coulinge
 Jessica Geneus as Vertueuse

Plot Summary

First part: "The Flight of the Eagle" 

A slave deemed too old and not productive enough by his owner, Toussaint 's father was thrown into the waters of Cap-Français, under the eyes of his own son, then only 8 years old. As an adult, Toussaint ( Jimmy Jean-Louis ) is employed on the Bréda estate by Bayon de Libertat ( Philippe Caroit ), who teaches him to read and write. The young man discovers the texts of Abbé Raynal, an Enlightenment philosopher who advocates the abolition of slavery. Toussaint then chooses to abandon his wife Suzanne ( Aïssa Maïga) and their two children to become the leader of a group of rebellious slaves . The Spanish troops noticed his military talents and enlisted him in the army which fought against France.

Second part: "The Battle of the Eagles" 

On the eve of the Revolution of 1789, Toussaint Louverture prepares Saint Domingue to free itself from its chains, imposed by French Colonization. Strong in character, steeped in democratic convictions, and then imbued with the brand new values and benefits of the nascent Republic, he allied himself with France after having fought alongside the Spaniards, the English and having refused the Alliance with the States of 'America.
After the betrayal of the Consul Bonaparte ( Thomas Langmann ), crowned since emperor in December 1804, Santo Domingo takes the name of Haiti, because Toussaint, at the cost of his life, will have made his country the first Independent Negro State from which slavery is finally banished. From his prison at Fort de Joux, he will be the very person who analyzes with hindsight and wisdom his behavior in the face of each situation.

References

External links

2012 films
Drama films based on actual events
France Télévisions television dramas
Best Diaspora Feature Africa Movie Academy Award winners
2010s French-language films
Senegalese drama films
Haitian historical drama films
French historical drama films
Films set in the 18th century
Haitian Revolution films
Cultural depictions of Toussaint Louverture
Depictions of Napoleon on film
Haitian Creole-language films
2010s French films